"Moment in the Sun" is the fourth track and second single from Australian rock band The Living End's album White Noise. The song was released to radio stations on 25 September 2008 and had its physical (as well as digital) release on 25 October 2008.

"Moment in the Sun" debuted on its first week of release (November 2008) at #100 on the Australian ARIA Singles Chart, remaining in the chart for one week.

Track listing 
All tracks written by Chris Cheney.

"Moment in the Sun" – 4:23
"New Frontier" – 4:20

Digital track listing
"Moment in the Sun" – 4:23
"Beware the Moon – 3:49

Charts

References 

2008 singles
The Living End songs
Songs written by Chris Cheney
2008 songs
Dew Process singles